The Inland Revenue Repeal Act 1870 (33 & 34 Vict c 99) was an Act of the Parliament of the United Kingdom.

The Inland Revenue Repeal Act 1870 was repealed by section 1(1) of, and Schedule 1 to, the Statute Law Revision Act 1950.

References
Halsbury's Statutes
The Incorporated Council of Law Reporting. The Law Reports: The Public General Statutes, 1870. Pages 670 to 675. Digitised copy from Google Books.

United Kingdom Acts of Parliament 1870